Nations at the 2017 World Championships in Athletics
World Championships in Athletics
Angola at the World Championships in Athletics